Michael (Mike) Suby is an American television and film score composer and music producer. He graduated from the Berklee College of Music in Boston, Massachusetts in 2000.

Filmography

Film

Television

Web

References

External links

Michael Suby Official Website

American film score composers
American male film score composers
Living people
Year of birth missing (living people)
La-La Land Records artists